Estadio Las Gaunas is a football stadium in Logroño, La Rioja, Spain. The stadium holds 16,000 spectators and was opened on 28 February 2002. It is the home ground of Segunda División club UD Logroñés, and the women's Primera División team EDF Logroño.

History and events
The stadium was opened in 2002 to replace the old stadium with the same name.

On 6 September 2011, it hosted the Spain national football team in a Euro 2012 qualifier against Liechtenstein, which the hosts won 6–0 with braces from Álvaro Negredo and David Villa. Earlier, on 16 October 2002, it staged a goalless friendly draw between Spain and Paraguay.

On 9 October 2015, Las Gaunas hosted the third match of the Spanish national team. This time, a Euro 2016 qualifier against Luxembourg, where Spain won by 4–0 with two goals of Paco Alcácer and other two of Santi Cazorla.

Attendances
This is a list of home attendance figures of UD Logroñés and SD Logroñés at league and playoffs games.

References

External links 
Estadios de Espana

UD Logroñés
CD Logroñés
Football venues in La Rioja (Spain)
Sports venues completed in 2002